David Balfour may refer to:
 David Balfour (1574–1634), Scottish-Danish shipbuilder, director of Bremerholm
 David Balfour, the main character and narrator in the books Kidnapped and Catriona by Robert Louis Stevenson
 David Balfour, an alternative title to the above-mentioned novel Catriona
David A. Balfour (1889–1956), Canadian politician
David A. Balfour Park named after the same politician
 David Paton Balfour (1841–1894), New Zealand sheepfarmer, station manager, roading supervisor and diarist

See also
Balfour (surname)

Balfour, David